Andy Vinci (born c. 1940) is a former American football coach.  He served as the head football coach at the University of San Diego in 1973 and at California State Polytechnic University, Pomona from 1974 to 1976, compiling a career college football record of 30–17–6.  Vinci resigned from his post at Cal Poly Pomona in December 1976.

Head coaching record

References

Year of birth missing (living people)
Living people
Cal Poly Pomona Broncos football coaches
San Diego Toreros football coaches
Junior college football coaches in the United States